The Altus Well Shed-Gazebo is a gazebo located adjacent to the central city park of Altus, Arkansas, near the junction of Franklin and Main Streets.  It is an octagonal structure, set on a foundation of cast concrete blocks, with eight stepped columns (also of concrete blocks) supporting a wooden roof frame with a metal shingle roof and finial.  The gazebo was built about 1920 covering a well that is believed to have been built in 1888, around the time a branch railroad line was built from Altus to a nearby coal mining area.

The gazebo was listed on the National Register of Historic Places in 1996.

See also
National Register of Historic Places listings in Franklin County, Arkansas

References

Park buildings and structures on the National Register of Historic Places in Arkansas
Buildings and structures in Franklin County, Arkansas
Pavilions in the United States
National Register of Historic Places in Franklin County, Arkansas
Gazebos